Everything's the Wrong Way is a 1981 Soviet comedy film directed by Vitali Fetisov and Vladimir Grammatikov.

Plot 
The film tells about a school graduate who falls in love with the girl he sees on the street and decides that he should marry her.

Cast 
 Olga Mashnaya as Natasha Yermakova
 Mikhail Efremov as Andrey Loskutov
 Oleg Tabakov
 Svetlana Nemolyaeva
 Aleksandr Pashutin
 Liliya Zakharova
 Alfiya Khabibulina as Lyuba (as L. Khabibulina)
 Igor Sternberg as Bob (as I. Shternberg)
 Vladimir Grammatikov
 Avangard Leontev as Lev Borisovich (as A. Leontev)

References

External links 
 

1981 films
1980s Russian-language films
Soviet comedy films
1981 comedy films
Soviet teen films